Howard–Bell–Feather House, also known as Bell–Feather House and old Feather's place, is a historic home located near Riner, Montgomery County, Virginia, United States.  It was built about 1810, and is a one- to two-story, three-bay, banked stone dwelling with a three-room plan.  Also on the property is a contributing small frame house dated to the early-20th century.

It was listed on the National Register of Historic Places in 1989.

References

Houses on the National Register of Historic Places in Virginia
Houses completed in 1810
Houses in Montgomery County, Virginia
National Register of Historic Places in Montgomery County, Virginia